Duplicity may refer to: 

 Duplicity (play), a 1781 comedy by Thomas Holcroft
Duplicity (Silent Descent album), 2000
Duplicity (Lee Konitz and Martial Solal album), 1978
Duplicity (film), a 2009 comedy thriller starring Clive Owen and Julia Roberts
Duplicity (law), when the charge on an indictment describes two different offences
Duplicity Remix EP, a 5-track EP by English trance metal band Silent Descent
"Duplicity" (Revenge), the fourth episode of the American television series Revenge
"Duplicity" (Smallville episode), an episode of Smallville
Duplicity (software), provides easy encrypted versioned remote backup of files

See also
Two-Face, a fictional comic book supervillain who appears in comic books published by DC Comics
Backstabber (disambiguation)
Machiavellianism (disambiguation)